The Volga Upland, also known as the Volga Uplands, Volga Hills, or Volga Plateau, is a vast region of the  East European Plain in the European part of Russia that lies west of the Volga River and east of the Central Russian Upland.  

The uplands lie in the cool continental climate zone, characterised by large fluctuations in seasonal temperatures and generally little rainfall. Outside of the cities in the region, population density is generally between 28 and 129 inhabitants per square mile.

Geography
The Tsimlyansk Reservoir lies at the southwestern end of the Volga Upland, with the Kuybyshev Reservoir at the northeastern end.

The landscape on the Volga Uplands is hilly, and several rivers have cut into it, such as the Khopyor, Medveditsa and the Sura. The Volga-Don Canal cuts through the lowlands between the Volga Uplands to the north and the adjacent Yergeni Hills to the south.

The Volga Uplands themselves are rather sparsely populated, but along their edges and in particular along the banks of the Volga there are several large cities, such as (from north to south) Kazan, Ulyanovsk, Saransk, Penza, Syzran, Saratov and Volgograd.

Subranges
The hill ranges along the Volga banks are traditionally called mountains, despite being of low height. The main ones are:
 Uslon Mountains
 Yuryevy Mountains
 Bogorodskye Mountains
 Syukeyevo Mountains
 Tetyushi Mountains
 Undory Mountains
 Zhiguli Mountains
 Khvalynsk Mountains
 Don-Medveditsa Ridge

See also 
Highest points of Russian Federal subjects
List of mountains and hills of Russia
 Taw yağı

References

External links

Plains of Russia
East European Plain
Volga basin